The 2009 Zolder Superleague Formula round was the second round of the 2009 Superleague Formula season, with the races taking place on 6 January 2009. The main support series for the event was the EuroBOSS series. Other supporting events included the Youngtimer Touring Car Challenge, Formule Ford Benelux, Dutch Supercar Challenge and the Dunlop Endurance Cup.

Report

Qualifying
FC Midtjylland (Kasper Andersen) claimed their first pole in the Superleague Formula in only their second competitive weekend in the series. They narrowly edged out Rangers F.C. (John Martin) to the pole position.

Race 1

Race 2
Race Two eventually got under way after a Safety Car start due to the rain and spray. Victims of the first racing lap were PSV Eindhoven (Dominick Muermans) who had a spin and CR Flamengo (Enrique Bernoldi) who ran over the back of Galatasaray S.K. (Duncan Tappy) ending both their races.

Results

Qualifying
 In each group, the top four qualify for the quarter-finals.

Group A

Group B

Knockout stages

Grid

Race 1

Race 2

Standings after the round

References

External links
 Official results from the Superleague Formula website

Zolder
Superleague Formula
Circuit Zolder